Shrikrishna Janardan Joshi (1915–1989) was a Marathi novelist from Maharashtra, India.

In his writings, he harshly depicted Pune, where he lived,  as a hub of Brahmin orthodoxy,.  He wrote several novels,  short stories, and essays, including award-winning novel Anandi Gopal, which is a fictional account of the life of Anandi Gopal Joshi. The novel was later adapted into an award-winning play Anandi Gopal.

He also authored a biography of R. D. Karve titled ' Raghunathachi Bakhar '.

References

Joshi, Shri
1915 births
1989 deaths